Cheshire Bridge may refer to:
 Cheshire Bridge (Connecticut River), connecting New Hampshire and Vermont, U.S.
 Cheshire Bridge, an historic bridge in the Atlanta area of Georgia, U.S.
 Cheshire Bridge Road, in Atlanta, named after the bridge